Celechair Ua hAirmedaig, Bishop of Clonfert, died 1186.

References
 http://www.ucc.ie/celt/published/T100005C/
 http://www.ucc.ie/celt/published/G105007/index.html
 The Surnames of Ireland, Edward MacLysaght, 1978.
 A New History of Ireland: Volume IX - Maps, Genealogies, Lists, ed. T.W. Moody, F.X. Martin, F.J. Byrne.

People from County Galway
Medieval Gaels from Ireland
12th-century Roman Catholic bishops in Ireland
Bishops of Clonfert